Weatherwise is a magazine for weather enthusiasts.

Weatherwise may also refer to:

WeatherWise USA, company of the Fixed bill energy pricing program
 Weatherwise, a character in 17th Century play No Wit, No Help Like a Woman's
Weatherwise (play), a short 1923 comedy by Noël Coward